Zachary "Zac" McKensie Alcorn (born August 24, 1980) is a former American football tight end. He was signed by the Green Bay Packers as an undrafted free agent in 2006. Alcorn appeared in six games with the Packers in 2006. He played college football at Black Hills State.

Alcorn has also been a member of the San Francisco 49ers and Kansas City Chiefs.

Early years
Alcorn attended Chadron Senior High School in Chadron, Nebraska, and was a letterman in football, basketball, and track & field as a discus thrower. In football, as a senior, he won All-Conference honors and All-State honors. In basketball, he was named the team M.V.P., and garnered All-State honors. Alcorn attended Black Hills State University in Spearfish, South Dakota.

External links
Green Bay Packers bio
San Francisco 49ers bio

1980 births
Living people
American football tight ends
Black Hills State Yellow Jackets football players
Green Bay Packers players
Kansas City Chiefs players
San Francisco 49ers players
Seattle Seahawks players
People from Chadron, Nebraska
Players of American football from Nebraska